Lars Olof Thorell (born 1967) is a Swedish politician, teacher and member of the Riksdag, the national legislature. A member of the Social Democratic Party, he has represented Västmanland County since October 2006.

Thorell is the son of engineer Lars Håkan Thorell and teacher Kia Ericson (née Scherlund). He was educated at Jamestown High School in the USA and in Hallstahammar. He studied part-time at Uppsala University and political science and economic history at Mälardalen University College. He taught Swedish for immigrants (SFI) at the Arbetarnas bildningsförbund (ABF) in Hedemora between 1990 and 1995 and was a Komvux tutor in Sala between 1995 and 1998. He was a high school (högstadium) teacher in Surahammar Municipality between 1998 and 2004.

References

1967 births
Living people
Members of the Riksdag 2006–2010
Members of the Riksdag 2010–2014
Members of the Riksdag 2014–2018
Members of the Riksdag 2018–2022
Members of the Riksdag 2022–2026
Members of the Riksdag from the Social Democrats
Swedish schoolteachers